Carter Faith Jones, known professionally as Carter Faith, is an American country music singer and songwriter.

Biography 
Faith was raised in Davidson, North Carolina, though relocated to Nashville, Tennessee to attend Belmont University and pursue a music career. 

Faith's first song titled "Leaving Tennessee" debuted in July 2020, and was followed by "Sinners in a Small Town" and "Easy Pill", with both songs also debuting in 2020. A project featuring acoustic versions of "Easy Pill" and "Leaving Tennessee", titled The Dusk Session" was released in April 2021. She was signed by Altadena, a record company founded by busbee partnered with Warner Bros. She also took home the top prize in an ASCAP sponsored event.  Faith is a part of the Song Suffragettes.

On August 20, 2021, she released her debut EP Let Love Be Love. In March 2022, she signed a publishing deal with Universal Music Publishing Nashville.

References 

American women singer-songwriters
Living people
21st-century American women
1999 births